Solihull Hospital is an acute general hospital in Solihull, West Midlands, England. It is managed by University Hospitals Birmingham NHS Foundation Trust.

History
The hospital has its origins in the Solihull Union Workhouse Infirmary which was completed in 1898. The hospital joined the National Health Service as Solihull Hospital in 1948.

A new purpose-built hospital was built at a cost of £38 million in the early 1990s and the new facilities were officially opened in June 1994. A new dermatology unit was opened in December 2015 and a new haematology and oncology day unit was opened in May 2018.

Notable staff
Geoffrey Gillam FRCP (1905–1970) was a consultant cardiologist at the hospital in the 1960s.

References

External links

NHS hospitals in England
Hospitals in Birmingham, West Midlands